National awakening or National Awakening may refer to:

Historical periods
Historical periods of ethnic or national revival are often referred to as "national awakenings":
Albanian National Awakening (1870–1912).
Bulgarian National Awakening (18th century) and National awakening of Bulgaria (19th century).
Estonian national awakening (1850s–1918)
Fennoman movement (1800s-1917)
Greek National Awakening (18th century till 1821)
Hindavi Swarajya (1645)
Illyrian movement (19th century)
Indonesian National Awakening (20th century).
Latvian National Awakening (three different periods).
Maccabees (2nd century BCE)
Serbian Revival (18th century–1878)
Zionism (19th-20th centuries)

Political parties and other groups
East Turkestan National Awakening Movement, a political movement supporting the independence of East Turkestan.
Khun Hynniewtrep National Awakening Movement, a movement in India
National Awakening (Iceland), a political party in Iceland from 1994 to 2000.
National Awakening Party, a political party in Indonesia.
Southern Azerbaijan National Awakening Movement, a separatist movement in Iran
Ulema National Awakening Party, a political party in Indonesia

See also
National revival